New Zealand Australian actor Russell Crowe has acted in blockbuster films such as Gladiator (2000), a historical epic for which he won the Academy Award for Best Actor. He is also a winner of the BAFTA Award for Best Actor in a Leading Role and Golden Globe Award for Best Actor – Motion Picture Drama for his portrayal of John Forbes Nash Jr. in the biographical drama A Beautiful Mind (2001).

Major associations

Academy Awards

AACTA Awards

BAFTA Awards

Golden Globe Awards

Screen Actors Guild Awards

Miscellaneous awards

MTV Movie & TV Awards

Satellite Awards

Saturn Awards

Critics' awards

Miscellaneous awards

References

External links 
 

Crowe, Russell